Sumner Wheeler White III (November 17, 1929 – October 24, 1988) was an American sailor and Olympic champion. He was born in New York City and died in Summit, New Jersey. He competed at the 1952 Summer Olympics in Helsinki, where, contrary to expectation, he won a gold medal in the 5.5 metre class with the boat Complex II, together with Britton Chance and Edgar White.

Raised in Mantoloking, New Jersey together with his twin brother Edgar, he graduated from Harvard University.

References

External links
 
 
 

1929 births
1988 deaths
American male sailors (sport)
Sailors at the 1952 Summer Olympics – 5.5 Metre
Olympic gold medalists for the United States in sailing
Medalists at the 1952 Summer Olympics
Harvard University alumni
People from Mantoloking, New Jersey
Sportspeople from Ocean County, New Jersey